Misery Chastain was a Christian deathcore band, that was formed by Seth Kimbrough, after his former band, Mortal Treason, disbanded. They have toured with bands such as A Plea For Purging, Whitechapel, War of Ages, Mychildren Mybride, and Becoming the Archetype.

History
Two years after the disestablishment of Mortal Treason, Seth Kimbrough announced that he was performing in a new band called, Misery Chastain. Misery Chastain uploaded three songs to their MySpace page entitled "The Unseen", "Behold the Beast" and "Under a Weeping Sky". Two of the songs, were a part of an EP titled Rurnt, which was released for free via PureVolume.

Misery Chastain toured around Alabama with bands such as Hidden Among Heroes and Me at the Least.

In March 2009, Misery Chastain released their debut entitled Awaiting the End.

In 2010, Misery Chastain broke up. Drummer, Seth Powell, joined the band Floodgates soon after. In 2014, Kimbrough announced that Mortal Treason had reunited, with Bassist Clay Byrom joining the band.

Members 
Last Known Line-Up
 Seth Kimbrough - vocals (2006-2010)
 Clay Byrom - bass (2006-2010)
 Wes Harrison - guitar (2006-2010)
 Jesse Mardis - guitar (2006-2010)
 Seth Powell - drums (2006-2010)
Former Members
 Luke Smith - guitar

References

Musical groups established in 2006
American deathcore musical groups
Musical groups disestablished in 2010
American Christian metal musical groups